"Place a Candle in the Window 'Till Your Laddie Boy Comes Home" is a World War I song written by Fern Glenn and composed by Maxwell Goldman. The song was first published in 1918 by Buck & Lowney in New York, New York. The sheet music cover depicts a soldier returning to a snow covered house with a candle in the window.

The sheet music can be found at the Pritzker Military Museum & Library as well as the University of South Carolina.

References

Bibliography

1918 songs
Songs of World War I